Giovan Battista Caniana (8 May 1671 – 5 May 1754) was an Italian sculptor and architect.

Biography
Caniana was born in Romano di Lombardia, and his father Giacomo Antonio, also a sculptor, died when he was 8 years old. His mother Datila sent him to study in Longhena, where he trained under Andrea Brustolon. A few years later Caniana returned to his family where he worked in a shop with his brothers. In 1694 after he married Bridget Grass, he turned to architecture and worked on a number of local projects. He died in Alzano Lombardo, aged 82.

His grandson, Giacomo Caniana, was also an architect.

References
 Content was partly derived from a translation of the Italian wiki article: Giovan Battista Caniana (Italian)

17th-century Italian architects
18th-century Italian architects
17th-century Italian sculptors
Italian male sculptors
18th-century Italian sculptors
Architects from Lombardy
1754 deaths
1671 births
People from Romano di Lombardia
18th-century Italian male artists